

Icarus
Icarus (Joshua "Jay" Guthrie) is a mutant superhero. He was a member of the student body at the Xavier Institute and a member of the New Mutants training squad. Jay was the son of Thomas and Lucinda Guthrie. Thomas dies early in Jay's life due to black lung, developed from working in local Kentucky coal mines. Jay's older siblings Sam (Cannonball) and Paige (Husk) are mutants as well, and both have been members of the X-Men. When he himself developed mutant powers, he hid them from his family. However, when performing in his band, he exposed his wings to the crowd as a 'stage gimmick'. Believed to be descended from the ancient race of Cheyarafim mutants, Icarus possesses red feathered, angel-like wings which allow flight and produce extensive regenerative enzymes allowing him to recover from normally fatal injuries. However, when his wings were removed, he lost his healing factor. His voice is capable of producing sonic frequency beyond the range of human capability as well as creating multiple sounds or voices at once.

After M-Day, Icarus was one of the few mutants who kept their powers; however, someone cut off his wings and left him bleeding at the doorsteps of the mansion. His healing factor did not cure these injuries as it was later revealed by Dr. McCoy that his healing powers came from his wings. Jay rebuffed efforts by his friend Elixir to heal his wings.

It was later revealed that Jay was actually tricked by William Stryker into giving up his wings, in exchange for his friends safety. Jay called him to inform the location of his friends, Stryker betrayed him by planting and activating a bomb to kill the students. Many of the de-powered students died in the blast. When Jay confronted William Stryker, Stryker confessed that not only was he responsible for the bombing on the bus but he was also responsible for the death of Julia Cabot, having given the other Cabots the armor. Stryker then proceeded to shoot Jay. Icarus was then shown dying with Nimrod deciding whether or not to finish him off. Nimrod left Jay alone, calculating that he was already mortally wounded. After that, Icarus was found dead by Ms. Marvel and Iron Man in Stryker's church with his hand in a position of writing, he was able to write "NIMR" plus half of the "O" with his own blood before he died.

Later, a memorial service was held for Icarus, as well as all of the other students who had died. The memorial was attended by the X-Men and Icarus's family including Husk, Aero, Cannonball and their mother Lucinda.

Following the foundation of a mutant state on Krakoa by Charles and his allies, Jay was reborn on the island thanks to The Five, a group of mutants able to combine their powers into a process of resurrection. He is shown living in the Akademos Habitat along with his siblings Sam, Paige and Melody.

During the "Judgment Day" storyline, Icarus was among the mutants that were hunted by Kraven the Hunter. Before he was slain, Icarus told Kraven the Hunter that Wolverine is the best among the mutants.

Other versions
In the Age of Apocalypse, Jay was believed to have died when his family home was attacked by the forces of Apocalypse. However, after the fall of Apocalypse's regime, he is revealed to have survived the ordeal, yet his activities while Apocalypse was still in power remain a mystery. When he made his presence known, he was an agent of Mister Sinister and appears to had lost at some point his red wings, or at least replaced them with a pair of bionic wings. Joshua reunited with Liz and Sam and upon searching the Seattle Core where Paige was left to die, they found their sister alive and well. Paige wanted revenge against the X-Men and her siblings were more than happy to help her. While Paige posed as a new student named Xorn, Joshua, and the others attacked Washington, D.C. to distract the X-Men away from their headquarters. Retreating when Paige succeeded in taking Rogue and her son Charles hostage, Joshua, and the others battled the X-Men again; however, Magneto was uninterested in taking prisoners. After watching Sunfire incinerate Liz, the Guthrie brothers attempted to escape. They didn't make it very far as Magneto trapped them in metal and crushed them to death.

Iceman

Icemaster
The Icemaster (Bradley Kroon) is a fictional supervillain created for one of a series of Hostess advertisements; his advertisement debuted in December 1979. He was the first character from the ad campaign to enter mainstream Marvel continuity when Kurt Busiek and Mark Bagley included him in an incarnation of the Masters of Evil composed of obscure characters.

Although how he gained his powers and abilities is unknown, Bradley Kroon had plans to create the next ice age as the Icemaster. He had frozen much of New York until he encountered the Human Torch. The Human Torch defeated him by throwing Hostess Fruit Pies to him, inducing his surrender.

Icemaster later appeared as a member of Crimson Cowl's Masters of Evil. In the story's plot, Icemaster is defeated when Hawkeye tricks Scorcher into accidentally blasting him. Before that, Icemaster accidentally hits Man-Killer, one of his own teammates, with an ice blast.

During the Fear Itself storyline, Icemaster is among the supervillains that escape from Raft after what Juggernaut in the form of Kurrth: Breaker of Stone did to it. Icemaster was seen with Living Laser, Bastards of Evil members Aftershock and Ember, and Whirlwind in Stamford. When Speedball attacked them, the villains managed to defeat Speedball. Upon leaving Stamford, Living Laser ridiculed Icemaster for eating too many fruit pies.

Icemaster was transferred to a prison in upstate New York. He and several other inmates stage a prison break, only to be defeated by Rogue and Mimic. Icemaster is later transferred to Pace Federal Penitentiary, and is among the hundred thousand prisoners attempting to kill Gambit (who had broken into Pace Federal Penitentiary) for a reward of one million dollars. Icemaster froze Gambit only to break free of the ice just as MI-13 and the Avengers Unity Squad arrive to defeat the prisoners.

Idunn

Ikaris

Ikthalon
Ikthalon is a demon who has clashed with Daimon Hellstrom. Ikthalon lives in a dimension known as the Ice World of Ikthalon. Ikthalon is an embodiment of man's tendency to resist change, and thus represents frozen stagnation.

Immortus

Impossible Man

In-Betweener

Indra

Inertia

Infectia

Infectia was a mutant in the Marvel Comics universe. She first appeared in X-Factor #28, published May 1988, and was created by Louise and Walt Simonson. Her mutant power allowed her to induce lethally unstable mutations in humans. She served as a minor adversary of the X-Force until she died of the Legacy Virus in X-Men (vol. 2) #27 (December 1993), and has made no appearances since.

Inferno

Infinity
Infinity is a cosmic entity associated with the concept of Space.

Ink

Shola Inkosi

Insect Queen

Interloper

Invisible Woman

Ion

Jason Ionello

Jason Ionello is a fictional character in Marvel Comics. The character, created by Kurt Busiek and Pat Olliffe, first appeared in Untold Tales of Spider-Man #1 (September 1995).

Jason Ionello was a popular student at Midtown High School who would often pick on Peter Parker along with Flash Thompson, Liz Allan, Sally Avril and Tiny McKeever. Ironically, they all idolized Spider-Man, not knowing that was actually Peter. He eventually attempted to learn Spider-Man's identity to earn a $1000 reward. He enlisted Sally's help in this endeavor, but became jealous when she flirted with Spider-Man. Later, Jason ran a red light while trying to catch Spider-Man, but collided with another vehicle. Sally was killed, and Jason suffered mild head trauma. Jason was left feeling bitter and soon turned on Flash and his friends. Later, Peter throws a party for Jason and Tiny, but Jason refuses to accept Peter as a friend. He later saves Liz during a fight between Spider-Man and the Headsman. Jason becomes depressed and attempts suicide, but is stopped by the Vulture who convinces him to blame Spider-Man for his problems. Jason disguises himself as Spider-Man and starts committing vandalism and brandishing a gun in an attempt to damage Spider-Man's reputation. Liz and Flash discover his exploits and talk him out of it. Jason was last seen in The Amazing Spider-Man #622 (February 2010) attending a party for Flash.

Jason Ionello in other media
 Jason Ionello has a non-voiced appearance in The Spectacular Spider-Man. He is part of Flash Thompson's football clique. In Midtown High's production of A Midsummer Night's Dream, he performs opposite Liz Allan.
In the Marvel Cinematic Universe, Jason Ionello is portrayed by Jorge Lendeborg Jr. In Spider-Man: Homecoming, he co-hosts Midtown School of Science and Technology's news station with Betty Brant, who it is implied he has a crush on. He, Betty, and Seymour O'Reilly are part of Liz Allan's group of friends. In Spider-Man: Far From Home, it is revealed that Jason was a victim of the Blip and was restored in 2023. While talking to Betty on the news station, he states his confusion and frustration that his younger brother, who survived the Blip, is now older than him. He has an uncredited appearance in Spider-Man: No Way Home.

Iron Cross

Helmut Gruler

Clare Gruler

Iron Fist

Iron Lad

Iron Man

Iron Man 2020

Iron Monger

Iron Patriot

Norman Osborn

Dr. Toni Ho

James Rhodes

Ironclad

ISAAC

Isbisa

Iso 

Iso is an Inhuman character, created by Charles Soule and Ryan Stegman, who first appeared in Inhuman #4. Originally named Xiaoyi Chen, Iso was transformed into an Inhuman by a bioweapon. She possesses the ability to manipulate air pressure around her and is a skilled medical technician.

In other media 
Iso appears in Avengers Assemble, voiced by Tania Gunadi.

It! The Living Colossus

References

Marvel Comics characters: I, List of